William Craven, D.D. (3 July 1730 – 28 January 1815) was a priest and academic in the second half of the 18th and the first decades of the 19th centuries.

Craven was born at Gouthwaite Hall and educated at Sedbergh School. He graduated B.A. from St John's College, Cambridge in 1753, and M.A. in 1756. He was ordained in 1759; and was a Fellow of St John's from 1759 to 1789; and its Master from then until his death. He was also Vice-Chancellor of the University of Cambridge from 1790 until 1791.

References 

18th-century English Anglican priests
19th-century English Anglican priests
Vice-Chancellors of the University of Cambridge
Alumni of St John's College, Cambridge
Fellows of St John's College, Cambridge
Masters of St John's College, Cambridge
1730 births
1815 deaths
People educated at Sedbergh School
People from Nidderdale
Sir Thomas Adams's Professors of Arabic